Doblada in Mexican food, is a corn tortilla or wheat tortilla,  folded one time, forming a half circle, or folded twice forming a quarter circle, which is sauteed in oil, covered with sauce and sprinkled with cheese. As a garnish, it can accompany some dishes as in carne a la tampiqueña or be an appetizer, as in enchiladas or enfrijoladas with no chicken filling.

References
Del Castillo, María. (1966). Cocina mexicana. Ed. Olimpo.

Mexican cuisine
Tortilla